Betty Burua (born 24 November 1986) is a Papua New Guinean track athlete who specializes in sprinting and the triple jump. She ran the 400 meters at the 2011 World Championships in Daegu, South Korea clocking 56.98 seconds to place 33 overall.

Personal Bests

All information taken from IAAF profile.

References

All-Athletics profile
Betty Burua Olympic profile
http://g2014results.thecgf.com/athlete/powerlifting/1024060/betty_burua.html

Living people
1986 births
Papua New Guinean female sprinters
People from the National Capital District (Papua New Guinea)
Athletes (track and field) at the 2006 Commonwealth Games
Athletes (track and field) at the 2010 Commonwealth Games
Athletes (track and field) at the 2014 Commonwealth Games
Commonwealth Games competitors for Papua New Guinea
World Athletics Championships athletes for Papua New Guinea